James Gerald McStay (4 August 1922 – 2007) was a professional footballer who played as a winger.

References

1922 births
2007 deaths
People from Newry
Association footballers from Northern Ireland
Association football wingers
Dundalk F.C. players
Grimsby Town F.C. players
Hastings United F.C. (1948) players
Boston United F.C. players
English Football League players
Republic of Ireland international footballers from Northern Ireland